Bluffers are harmless North American reptiles.

Bluffers may also refer to:

 The Bluffers, a children's cartoon series
 The Bluffers (film), a 1915 short film

See also

 Bluff (disambiguation)